Brown County is a county in the U.S. state of South Dakota. As of the 2020 United States Census, the population was 38,301, making it the fourth-most populous county in South Dakota. Its county seat is Aberdeen. The county is named for Alfred Brown, of Hutchinson County, South Dakota, a Dakota Territory legislator in 1879.

Brown County is part of the Aberdeen, SD Micropolitan Statistical Area.

Geography
Brown County lies on the north side of South Dakota. Its north boundary line abuts the south boundary line of the state of North Dakota. The James River flows south-southwest through the county; its entry point into neighboring Spink County marks Brown County's lowest elevation: 1,266' (386m) ASL. The terrain of Brown County consists of rolling terrain, sloping to the south and east, largely devoted to agriculture.

Major highways

 U.S. Highway 12
 U.S. Highway 281
 South Dakota Highway 10
 South Dakota Highway 37

Adjacent counties

 Dickey County, North Dakota - north
 Sargent County, North Dakota - northeast
 Marshall County - east
 Day County - southeast
 Spink County - south
 Faulk County - southwest
 Edmunds County - southwest
 McPherson County - northwest

Protected areas
 Bodi State Game Production Area (part)
 Casanova State Game Production Area
 Columbia State Game Production Area
 Cutler State Game Production Area
 Diagonal Trees State Game Production Area
 Elm Creek State Game Production Area (part)
 Erickson State Game Production Area
 Hansen Preserve State Game Production Area
 Hart Quarter State Game Production Area
 Hecla State Game Production Area
 Jilek-Dahme State Game Production Area
 Pigors Lake State Game Production Area
 Putney Slough State Game Production Area
 Putney State Game Production Area
 Renziehausen Slough State Game Bird Refuge
 Renziehausen State Game Production Area (part)
 Richmond Dam State Game Production Area
 Richmond Lake State Recreation Area
 Richmond State Lakeside Use Area
 Sand Lake National Wildlife Refuge
 Zabrasha State Game Production Area

Demographics

2000 census
As of the 2000 United States Census, there were 35,460 people, 14,638 households, and 9,324 families in the county. The population density was 21 people per square mile (8/km2). There were 15,861 housing units at an average density of 9 per square mile (4/km2). The racial makeup of the county was 95.47% White, 0.28% Black or African American, 2.72% Native American, 0.40% Asian, 0.09% Pacific Islander, 0.18% from other races, and 0.86% from two or more races. 0.67% of the population were Hispanic or Latino of any race. 55.0% were of German and 12.7% of Norwegian ancestry.

There were 14,638 households, out of which 29.60% had children under the age of 18 living with them, 52.80% were married couples living together, 7.90% had a female householder with no husband present, and 36.30% were non-families. 30.80% of all households were made up of individuals, and 12.10% had someone living alone who was 65 years of age or older. The average household size was 2.32 and the average family size was 2.91.

The county population contained 23.60% under the age of 18, 11.60% from 18 to 24, 26.70% from 25 to 44, 21.90% from 45 to 64, and 16.20% who were 65 years of age or older. The median age was 37 years. For every 100 females, there were 93.30 males. For every 100 females age 18 and over, there were 89.50 males.

The median income for a household in the county was $35,017, and the median income for a family was $44,788. Males had a median income of $29,592 versus $20,445 for females. The per capita income for the county was $18,464. About 7.00% of families and 9.90% of the population were below the poverty line, including 10.30% of those under age 18 and 10.30% of those age 65 or over.

2010 census
As of the 2010 United States Census, there were 36,531 people, 15,489 households, and 9,374 families in the county. The racial makeup of the county was 93.2% white, 3.0% American Indian, 1.0% Asian, 0.5% black or African American, 0.1% Pacific islander, 0.4% from other races, and 1.7% from two or more races. Those of Hispanic or Latino origin made up 1.4% of the population. In terms of ancestry,

Of the 15,489 households, 28.4% had children under the age of 18 living with them, 48.5% were married couples living together, 8.1% had a female householder with no husband present, 39.5% were non-families, and 33.0% of all households were made up of individuals. The average household size was 2.27 and the average family size was 2.89. The median age was 38.6 years.

The median income for a household in the county was $45,615 and the median income for a family was $58,683. Males had a median income of $37,997 versus $28,419 for females. The per capita income for the county was $23,878. About 5.6% of families and 10.2% of the population were below the poverty line, including 9.6% of those under age 18 and 15.4% of those age 65 or over.

Politics
Brown County was long a Democratic stronghold, home to notable Democrats including South Dakota Governor Ralph Herseth, US Senate majority leader Tom Daschle and Congresswoman Stephanie Herseth Sandlin. It generally voted Democratic except in Republican landslides (though often relatively narrowly margins) in presidential elections from 1932 until 1996. Since then, Brown County has trended Republican, particularly at the local level, although the county was carried by Barack Obama in 2008.

Communities

Cities
Aberdeen (county seat)
Columbia
Groton

Towns

Claremont
Frederick
Hecla
Stratford
Verdon
Warner
Westport

Census-designated places

Bath
Bath Corner
Ferney
Hutterville Colony
Mansfield (partial)
Prairiewood Village

Unincorporated communities

Barnard
Houghton
Huffton
 James
 Nahon
Ordway
Putney
 Richmond
 Richmond Heights
Rudolph
 Tacoma Park
 Winship

Townships

 Aberdeen
 Allison
 Bates
 Bath
 Barnard
 Cambria
 Carlisle
 Claremont
 Columbia
 East Hanson
 East Rondell
 Franklyn
 Frederick
 Garden Prairie
 Garland
 Gem
 Greenfield
 Groton
 Hecla
 Henry
 Highland
 Lansing
 Liberty
 Lincoln
 Mercier
 New Hope
 North Detroit
 Oneota
 Ordway
 Osceola
 Palmyra
 Portage
 Prairiewood
 Putney
 Ravinia
 Richland
 Riverside
 Savo
 Shelby
 South Detroit
 Warner
 West Hanson
 West
 Westport

See also
 National Register of Historic Places listings in Brown County, South Dakota

External links
 Brown County, SD government website

References

 
1881 establishments in Dakota Territory
Populated places established in 1881
Aberdeen, South Dakota micropolitan area